The Fairview Flyers are a junior "B" ice hockey team based in Fairview, Alberta, Canada. The team is a member of the North West Junior Hockey League and the 2012-13 season was their inaugural season.

History 
The team was founded as the Fairview Junior Hockey Club in June 2012. The expansion team was officially named the Fariview Flyers in July.

In only their third year the Fairview Flyers advanced to the league finals. Although the Flyers lost the championships (they played the North Peace Navigators), circumstances resulted in the team advancing to the Russ Barnes Trophy to determine the Alberta Junior B Provincial Champion.

Inaugural season 
The Fairview Flyers began their inaugural season on the road against the North Peace Navigators on September 28, 2012. Their home opener was held on October 5 against the Sexsmith Vipers.

Season-by-season record 
Note: GP = Games played, W = Wins, L = Losses, OTL = Overtime Losses, Pts = Points, GF = Goals for, GA = Goals against, PIM = Penalties in minutes

Russ Barnes Trophy
Alberta Jr. B Provincial Championships

See also 
List of ice hockey teams in Alberta

References 

Ice hockey teams in Alberta
2012 establishments in Alberta
Ice hockey clubs established in 2012